Mandaluyong, officially the City of Mandaluyong, is a first class highly urbanized city in the National Capital Region of the Philippines. According to the 2020 census, it has a population of 425,758 people.

Located directly east of Manila, Mandaluyong was originally a barrio of Santa Ana de Sapa (now a district of Manila) called San Felipe Neri. It separated and became its own town in 1841, and later acquired the name Mandaluyong in 1931 during the American occupation. In 1994, it became the first municipality of Metro Manila to become a city since the metropolis' establishment in 1975.

At present, it is known for the Ortigas Center, a commercial and business center that it also shares with the city of Pasig. Notable institutions and establishments in the city include the Asian Development Bank, the headquarters of Banco de Oro and San Miguel Corporation and shopping malls like Shangri-La Plaza and SM Megamall.

The city is bordered by Manila to the west, San Juan to the north, Quezon City to the northeast, Pasig to the east, and Makati to the south.

Etymology
There are different stories on the origin of the name Mandaluyong.

One tells of how the place was abundant with a kind of tree called luyong, now more commonly known as anahaw (Saribus rotundifolius), from which canes and furniture were made.

Another claims that the Spaniards named the place based on the report of a navigator named Acapulco, who saw the rolling hills frequently being lashed at by daluyong (“big waves from the sea”).  This seems to confirm traditional pre-Hispanic stories that giant waves from the sea would meet the adjoining hills of the vast lowland, referred to as salpukan ng alon. Felix dela Huerta, a Franciscan historian, observed that the rolling topography of this land resembled giant waves of the sea.

As with the etymological legends of many Philippine places, when the foreigners asked what the place was called, the locals answered with the description "madaluyong" ("undulating"), later transcribed by Spanish writers as "Mandaluyong," with the addition of an “n”.

Another version of the name is based on a legend that a Maharlika named Luyong fell in love with Manda, the lovely daughter of a barangay chieftain. The chieftain did not like Luyong and forbade him Manda's hand. Luyong overcame this objection by winning a series of tribal contests, as was the custom at the time. The couple settled thereafter in a place which was later called “Mandaluyong" - a term made up of joining their names.

History

Early history
Residents of Mandaluyong have always been known for their industry. Men did the laundry to the amusement of non-residents until shortly after the war, while the women ironed the clothes.

These industrious people trace their roots to Emperor Soledan (also known as "Anka Widyaya" of the Great Madjapahit Empire) and Empress Sasaban of the Kingdom of Sapa, whose son Prince Balagtas ruled as sovereign of the kingdom in about the year 1300.

More than a century later, in about the year 1470, it expanded and was called the "Kingdom of Namayan" with "Lakan Takhan" as sovereign. The vast Kingdom comprised what are now Quiapo, San Miguel, Sta, Mesa, Paco, Pandacan, Malate, Malate and Santa Ana in Manila, and Mandaluyong, San Juan, Makati, Pasay, Pateros, Taguig, Parañaque, and portions of Pasig and Quezon City up to Diliman, which were then part of Mandaluyong.

Spanish colonial era

Establishment 
Mandaluyong was first known as a barrio of Santa Ana de Sapa, which was part of the District of Paco, Province of Tondo (later known as the Province of Manila). It was named San Felipe Neri by the Spaniards in honor of the patron saint of Rome. It was separated civilly from Santa Ana de Sapa in 1841.

On September 15, 1863, San Felipe Neri established its own parish. Under the administration of the Congregation “Dulcísimo Nombre de Jesús”, it constructed its own church, convent and school. The Parish of San Felipe Neri played a significant role as a relay station for propagating the Katipunan during the 1896–1898 Revolution.

Original barrios
According to Pedro Patricio in his book (Mandaluyong: 1837–1975), Mandaluyong had five original barrios (Poblacion, Barangka, Hagdang Bato, Namayan, & Hulo) as per the first recorded census in 1903. From these five evolved 22 sub-barrios.

During the Philippine Revolution 
Mandaluyong was significant in the Philippine Revolution of 1896 as the baluarte (territory) of the Katipunan or "Makabuhay" group, with seventeen branches.

On August 29, 1896, Andres Bonifacio, together with Emilio Jacinto and other members of the Katipunan went into the house of Romualdo Vicencio at Sitio Balakbak (now Villa San Miguel) to prepare for the upcoming revolution against Spanish authority. In this site, Bonifacio read the last manifestation of the Katipunan before they transferred in Hagdan Bato, in the house of Felix Sanchez. This event is also known as the "29 De Agosto" and "Pinagtipunan" in which it is already named in two streets near the historic Barangay Hagdan Bato Itaas. It was in Barangay Hagdang Bato on August 28, 1896, where Andres Bonifacio issued a proclamation setting Saturday, August 29, 1896, as the date of the attack on Manila.

On August 30, 1896, after the successfully revolution in San Felipe Neri, the Katipuneros went to San Juan del Monte and attacked the El Polvorin (gunpowder depot) in order to amass more weapons to use against the Spaniards. This event is popularly known as the Battle of San Juan del Monte. It was also in this town that the revolutionary paper, La Republika, was established on September 15, 1896.

American colonial era
On June 11, 1901, San Felipe Neri was incorporated into the newly established province of Rizal. During the American Occupation, it was raised to a first-class municipality with five barrios, namely: Poblacion, Barangka, Hagdang Bato, Namayan and Hulo. By virtue of Act No. 942, it was consolidated with the municipality of San Juan del Monte and became the seat of the municipal government. For several months in 1904, San Felipe Neri became the capital of Rizal. San Juan del Monte was later separated from San Felipe Neri to regain its independent municipality status on March 27, 1907.

San Felipe Neri was renamed to its present name of Mandaluyong on November 6, 1931, by virtue of Act No. 3836. Many government infrastructures are established during the American Period, including the Correctional Institute for Women, Welfareville Compound, The Boy's Town, and the National Center for Mental Health.

World War II  
From 1942 to 1945, during World War II, Mandaluyong formed part of the City of Greater Manila, along with Manila, Quezon City, and other nearby towns of Rizal. Also during the war, Mandaluyong lost many of her people; among them were Catholic priests and civilians. Destruction was felt all over, but with the timely arrival of the American Liberation Forces and the Philippine Commonwealth troops on February 9, 1945, the municipality was saved from further damages. That day became a red calendar day for Mandaluyong marking its liberation from the Japanese Imperial forces by the Allies.

Post-independence era
After World War II, Mandaluyong began to become progressive and dramatically increase the economy. Many infrastructures, companies, and other businesses were developed in 1950s–1960s and as the result, making Mandaluyong recognized as the most developed municipality in the province of Rizal.

Marcos dictatorship era

Ambush of Juan Ponce Enrile

Mandaluyong played a small part in Ferdinand Marcos' efforts to rationalize his declaration of Martial law because the alleged 1972 ambush of Juan Ponce Enrile took place in Wack Wack, an exclusive neighborhood in Mandaluyong, in the hours immediately preceding its implementation.  Because the alleged ambush took place in an exclusive subdivision, no independent eyewitnesses of the event have come forward, and witnesses of the immediate aftermath are few. This has lent credence to accounts which say that the ambush was faked, and that the site was selected specifically because it was easy to stage the incident there. The 14-year period which followed that night is remembered for the Marcos administration's record of human rights abuses, particularly targeting political opponents, student activists, journalists, religious workers, farmers, and others who fought against the Marcos dictatorship.

Industrial growth and government takeover efforts 
A prominent figure in Philippine business before Martial Law was Mandaluyong-based industrialist Domingo M. Guevara, Sr., whose success began when he created Radiowealth, a brand of affordable Philippine-made appliances including radios and televisions. This eventually became the Mandaluyong-based Guevara Enterprises which dominated the fields of electronics, communications, agriculture and industrial development, transportation, and manufacturing in the Philippines, whose headquarters was on Libertad (now D.M. Guevarra).  National Artist Nick Joaqin noted that Guevara's projects - which included the manufacturing the "Sakbayan," which was the ever first Philippine-made car - brought the Philippine economy to the verge of Newly Industrialized Country status in the years before Martial Law. However, the growth of Guevara's businesses stopped when he refused to surrender control of his businesses to President Ferdinand Marcos during Martial Law, and Marcos retaliated by making it difficult for Guevarra to do business.

Separation from Rizal province

On November 7, 1975, Mandaluyong was formally included in newly established Metropolitan Manila by virtue of Presidential Decree No. 824 signed by President Ferdinand Marcos.

Cityhood

By virtue of the 1987 Constitution, Mandaluyong and the then-municipality of San Juan were represented in Congress by a single congressman.

San Juan–Mandaluyong Rep. Ronaldo Zamora sponsored a House Bill which eventually became Republic Act No. 7675 otherwise known as "An Act Converting the Municipality of Mandaluyong into a Highly Urbanized City to be known as the City of Mandaluyong." President Fidel V. Ramos signed R.A. No. 7675 into law on February 9, 1994 (the 49th anniversary of its liberation from the Japanese), which was ratified through a plebiscite on April 10, 1994, making Mandaluyong the fifth city in Metro Manila. Mandaluyong became a lone district with its own representative in Congress. Prior to the enactment of the assailed statute, the municipalities of Mandaluyong and San Juan belonged to only one legislative district.

Contemporary history
Mandaluyong today is composed of 27 barangays divided into two political districts mainly by Boni Avenue and G. Aglipay Street. As of January 9, 2002, it has 1,238 voting precincts and 166,037 registered voters.

In 2003, Mandaluyong was recognized as "The Tiger City of the Philippines" because of dramatic improvement in the city's economy.

Geography

To the south lies Makati, to the northwest, San Juan, and to the northeast, Quezon City. Thus Mandaluyong is located at the center of Metro Manila.

Barangays

Mandaluyong is politically subdivided into 27 barangays.

Climate
Mandaluyong's climate is classified as tropical. In winter, there is much less rainfall in Mandaluyong than in summer. This climate is considered to be Aw according to the Köppen-Geiger climate classification. The temperature here averages . January has the lowest average temperature of the year.

Demographics

Economy

The city is home to a number of shopping centers, entertainment hubs, commercial establishments, high-rise offices, residential condominiums and hotels. The city is one of the important business and financial areas in the metropolis.

Commercial activities

Like other cities in Metro Manila, Mandaluyong has its own share of commercial strips and a central business district.
The former commercial area, consisting mostly of banks, offices and service establishments, stretch along public transport routes thereby serving both local consumers and passers-by from the neighboring localities.
Major commercial strips of the city include the stretch of Boni Avenue, Shaw Boulevard, Libertad-Sierra Madre area, Kalentong, San Francisco, part of Martinez, Sgt. Bumatay towards Barangka Drive and Pinatubo towards EDSA. Mandaluyong's central business district is concentrated on the EDSA-Shaw-Pioneer area.

Industrial activities

Industrial activities are mostly concentrated within the Shaw Boulevard-Pioneer area and along the Pasig River. Although prominent in the manufacture of foods, medicines and laboratory equipment, these industries are gradually declining in number, opting to relocate in newly developed industrial zones outside Metropolitan Manila. In the Pasig River area, particularly in Barangays Namayan and Mabini J. Rizal, areas formerly industrial are now the sites for residential subdivisions and townhouses. In the EDSA-Shaw-Pioneer area, the transformation is toward a more economically profitable and globally competitive commercial activity. And since December 2013, Mandaluyong is the home of one of the largest television networks in the country TV5 and one of the largest pay TV operator Cignal TV (both owned by the PLDT-backed firm MediaQuest Holdings located at the TV5 Media Center), Nine Media Corporation-owned news channel CNN Philippines and the master playout facility of Solar Entertainment Corporation (both are located at the Worldwide Corporate Center which also housed the main offices of companies owned by real estate magnate and former Senator Manny Villar), and several radio stations associated to the Vera Group (Mellow 94.7, Magic 89.9, 99.5 Play FM, 103.5 K-Lite, DWBL and DWSS, all are located at the Paragon Plaza).

Shopping centers
These super-regional supermalls each have over a hundred local and international stores and are anchored by at least one department store and supermarket or hypermarket. They are the largest malls in Metro Manila which feature not just stores but also such attractions as movie theaters, rides, skating rinks, bowling alleys and other recreational facilities. Each provides thousands of automobile parking spaces and are located mostly near rail stations and established business districts within the metropolis. These malls serve not only the Metro Manila and Greater Manila Area residents, but also local and foreign tourists. Among the malls in the city are Shangri-La Plaza and SM Megamall.

Government

Elected officials
2022 local election results:

Mayors of Mandaluyong
Listed below are persons who have served as mayors of Mandaluyong.

Transportation

The city is provided with good access roads to and from adjacent cities in the metropolis. The city is served by one of Metro Manila's main roads such as the Epifanio de los Santos Avenue (EDSA), Ortigas Avenue and Shaw Boulevard.

Airport
The city is 36 minutes away from Ninoy Aquino International Airport.

Land
Mandaluyong is served by the Epifanio de los Santos Avenue, Metro Manila's main thoroughfare. Considered as the heart of the metropolis, main roads such as the Ortigas Avenue and Shaw Boulevard provide inter-city linkages, while Boni Avenue and Martinez Street (C-3 Road) serve as alternate routes in the city. Other major roads in Mandaluyong include Boni-Pioneer Underpass, a 280-meter long tunnel underneath EDSA (Epifanio de los Santos Avenue) connecting Boni Avenue on its western-end and Pioneer Street on the east. and Julia Vargas Avenue. Jeepneys are one of the most common modes of public transportation for commuters in the city. Aside from jeepneys, tricycles and pedicabs are also one of the important modes of public transportation in Mandaluyong, especially on alleys around the city.

Water
The presence of the Pasig River stretching along the south border of Mandaluyong provides an alternative route and mode of public transportation mainly for cargo freight of industries along the river, and for commuters seeking for a faster and more direct route to and from the cities of Pasig and Manila. The Pasig River Ferry Service has one station in the city.

Railway

The city is also served by rail via the Manila Metro Rail Transit System Line 3. The line is located along the Epifanio de los Santos Avenue. The city is served by three Line 3 stations:

Ortigas
Shaw Boulevard
Boni

Bridges

Mandaluyong is accessed by the Pasig River and the San Juan River:

Healthcare

Mandaluyong has several private and public hospitals & health center, namely the privately owned Dr. Victor R. Potenciano Medical Center along EDSA and Unciano General Hospital, and the government hospital Mandaluyong City Medical Center. The city is also home to the National Center for Mental Health. Many residents, specifically the middle-to-upper class medical clientele, visit the nearby The Medical City in Ortigas Center.

The Dr. Victor R. Potenciano Medical Center is a tertiary care hospital that has a 189-bed capacity within its 10-storey hospital building.

In 2007, the Mandaluyong city government, together with non-governmental organization Rehabilitation and Empowerment of Adults and Children (REACH) Foundation, established a community-based rehabilitation program called Project Therapy, Education, and Assimilation of Children with Handicap (TEACH), that caters to children with special needs coming from indigent families. Services given by Project TEACH include free occupational therapy, physical therapy, speech therapy and special education classes.

Education

Four well-known educational institutions in the city are the Arellano University, Mandaluyong (Plaridel Campus), Don Bosco Technical College, Jose Rizal University and Rizal Technological University.

A good number of city officials of Mandaluyong are alumni of Don Bosco, including incumbent Mayor, Benjamin Abalos Jr. (HS '79); former Vice Mayor, Renato Santa Maria (HS '65); City Councilors Edward Bartolome (HS '96), Noel Bernardo (HS '79), and Jonathan Abalos (HS '85). Other notable alumni include "King of Pinoy Rap," Francis Magalona (HS '81); and actor Ricky Davao (HS '78). Meanwhile, the alumni of JRU that includes President Ramon Magsaysay, Roderick Paulate, and Secretary Armand V. Fabella; 
Other colleges in the city include the Our Lady of Guadalupe Colleges (specializing in Medicine and Nursing), STI and AMA (both specializing in Computer Technology education, both located on Shaw Boulevard), NAMEI Polytechnic Institute (specializing in Marine Sciences), and the International Baptist College.

The city is also home to Lourdes School of Mandaluyong (est. 1959), a Franciscan-Marian all-boys school, located in the Ortigas Center district managed by the OFM Capuchins; La Salle Green Hills (est. 1959), a private co-educational school, managed by the De La Salle Brothers, located along Ortigas Avenue; and Saint Pedro Poveda College (est. 1960), another all-girls institution, offering pre-school, grade school, high school, and college education. Although the official school address is Quezon City, part of the lot Poveda's campus stands on is under Mandaluyong.

Mandaluyong High School (est. 1977) is the oldest public high school in the city. City of Mandaluyong Science High School (est. 1996), a public science high school on E. Pantaleon St. The city has 18 public schools, including primary and secondary schools as prioritize by the city government. The Mataas Na Paaralang Nepatli A. Gonzales is the largest school in Mandaluyong and the only school in the city which has the STEM highschool program. The Neptalians are also multi- awarded and has various great observations by the regional supervisors that captures their attentions.

International relations

Diplomatic missions

Countries that have set up permanent missions or embassies in the city include:

Sister cities

Notable personalities

See also
List of renamed cities and municipalities of the Philippines

References

External links

[ Philippine Standard Geographic Code]

 
1841 establishments in the Philippines
Cities in Metro Manila
Highly urbanized cities in the Philippines
Populated places established in 1841
Populated places on the Pasig River